Crockett's Cove Presbyterian Church, also known as Cove Brick Church, is a historic Presbyterian church located near Wytheville, Wythe County, Virginia. The church was built in 1858, and is a small rectangular, Greek Revival style brick church building. The church served as a hospital following the Battle of Cove Mountain.

It was listed on the National Register of Historic Places in 1992.

References

Churches completed in 1858
Greek Revival church buildings in Virginia
19th-century Presbyterian church buildings in the United States
Churches in Wythe County, Virginia
Churches on the National Register of Historic Places in Virginia
Presbyterian churches in Virginia
National Register of Historic Places in Wythe County, Virginia